Edward James de Souza (born 4 September 1932) is a British character actor and graduate of RADA, who is of Portuguese-Indian and English descent.

Early life
De Souza was the only child of Annie Adeline Swift (née Calvert) and Edward Valentine De Souza Jr. (Rangoon 1881–1947), a graduate of the University of Cambridge who was of Portuguese-Indian descent (his father originated from Goa). De Souza was brought up primarily by his mother because his father died when De Souza was just 14.

Career
From 1961 to 1966, he starred in the sitcom Marriage Lines with Richard Briers and Prunella Scales. De Souza had roles in the Hammer films The Phantom of the Opera and The Kiss of the Vampire (both 1962). In the same year, he appeared in "Six Hands Across the Table", an episode of British television series The Avengers.

De Souza appeared as the lead character, space security agent Marc Cory, in the Doctor Who story "Mission to the Unknown" (1965) – the only story ever broadcast in the series not to feature the Doctor in any capacity. In 1977, he played Sheik Hosein in the James Bond film The Spy Who Loved Me. He was solicitor Bonny Bernard in the first series of Rumpole of the Bailey (1978). In the same year, he appeared in "Hearts and Minds", the last episode of The Sweeney to be filmed, which featured the popular comedians Morecambe and Wise. In 1982, he appeared in the final Sapphire & Steel adventure as "The Man". He appeared in Edward the Seventh (1975), After Henry (1989–1990), and Farrington. He had a cameo  in the 2007 fantasy film The Golden Compass. In succession to Valentine Dyall, the originator of the role,  he was The Man in Black on BBC Radio 4 between 1988 and 1992. In 1993, De Souza played the role of Afonso in the One Foot in the Grave special One Foot in the Algarve. 

He joined the British soap opera Coronation Street as Colin Grimshaw, making his first appearance on 12 December 2008. His character died in May 2009.

Selected filmography 
The Fourth Square (1961) – 1st Reporter
The Roman Spring of Mrs. Stone (1961) – (uncredited)
The Phantom of the Opera  (1962) – Harry Hunter
The Kiss of the Vampire (1963) – Gerald Harcourt
The Main Chance (1964) – Michael Blake
Jules Verne's Rocket to the Moon (1967) – Henri
Jane Eyre (1973) – Mason 
The Spy Who Loved Me (1977) – Sheikh Hosein
The Thirty Nine Steps (1978) – Woodville
On a Paving Stone Mounted (1978)
The Golden Lady (1979) – Yorgo Praxis
Home Before Midnight (1979) – Archer
The Return of the Soldier (1982) – Edward
A Question of Attribution (film / script: Alan Bennett; director: John Schlesinger) (1991)
Jane Eyre (1996) – Mason
The Golden Compass (2007) – Second High Councilor 
Grave Tales (2011) – Mr. Petersen
Mr. Turner (2014) – Thomas Stothard

References

External links

1932 births
Living people
Male actors from Kingston upon Hull
English male soap opera actors
Male actors from Yorkshire
English male film actors
20th-century English male actors
21st-century English male actors
English people of Portuguese descent
English people of Indian descent
Alumni of RADA